The Doug flag, also referred to as the Cascadian flag or the Cascadia Doug flag and nicknamed "Old Doug" or simply "the Doug", is one of the primary symbols and an unofficial flag of the Cascadia bioregion, which roughly encompasses the U.S. states of Oregon  and Washington, the Canadian province of British Columbia, and other parts of North America's Pacific Northwest. It was designed by Portland, Oregon native Alexander Baretich in the academic year of 1994–1995. It is named after the Douglas fir, featured on the flag.

Conception and description

The Doug flag was designed by Portland, Oregon native Alexander Baretich in the academic year of 1994–1995. He recalled:

According to the Cascadia Department of Bioregion, the flag symbolizes "the natural beauty and inspiration that the Pacific Northwest provides, and is a direct representation of the bioregion". 

The flag is a tricolor consisting of three horizontal stripes of blue, white, and green, charged with a single Douglas fir tree in the center. The blue stripe represents the sky, Pacific Ocean and Salish Sea, as well as the myriad of rivers in the bioregion including the Columbia, the Snake, and Fraser Rivers. The white represents clouds and snow and the green represents the region's countless fields and evergreen forests. The tree symbolizes "endurance, defiance and resilience against fire, flood, catastrophic change, and ever increasingly against the anthropocentric man". According to Baretich and CascadiaNow!, "all these symbols of color and images come together to symbolize what being Cascadian is all about."

Usage

The Cascadian Flag is copyrighted by Alexander Baretich and his company the Cascadian Flag Cooperative, Inc. Their permission should be obtained before any use. 

Since its inception, Baretich's design has gained popularity and earned status as the unofficial flag of Cascadia. In 2014, Kelton Sears of Vice Media said the flag "has quickly become the dominant symbol of the nascent Cascadian identity", appearing on microbreweries' beer labels and at local events, including Portland Timbers games, gay pride parades, environmental protests, and activities affiliated with the Occupy movement. The flag appears on boxes of beer from Phillips Brewing in Victoria, British Columbia. The Seattle-based folk band Fleet Foxes included the flag on the back of their 2011 studio album Helplessness Blues.

In 2015, Baretich expressed his hope that his designs "would not be used for hate, exploitation, and anything that goes against the values or principles of bioregionalism". Furthermore, he said, "In seeking out a bioregional flag, I believe that it's the bioregion that captures the artist—not the  artist capturing the bioregion."

The flag featured as part of Seattle Sounders FC's 2021–2022 home jersey, being displayed on the back near the neckline.

See also
 1994 in art
 Cascadia (independence movement)

References

External links

 Oh, Cascadia!… What Are You, Exactly? by Sally McCoy (September 26, 2013), The Corvallis Advocate
 The Cascadian Flag: A Transformative Icon by Alexander Baretich (November 10, 2014), Free Cascadia
 Bioregion of Cascadia, Oregon Flag Registry
 CascadiaNow! advocates shift in culture, not secession by Alicia Halberg (May 24, 2012), The Seattle Times
 The Washington State Flag Sucks by Kelton Sears (August 26, 2014), Seattle Weekly
 Solidarity! Cascadia Around Town by Brianna Brey (January 24, 2013), The Source Weekly

1994 establishments in the United States
Activism flags
Canada–United States relations
Culture of British Columbia
Culture of the Pacific Northwest
Flags introduced in 1994
Separatism in Canada
Separatism in the United States
Unofficial flags